Ravna Romanija (Cyrillic: Равна Романија) is a village in the municipality of Sokolac, Republika Srpska, Bosnia and Herzegovina.

Geography
The village, named "flat Romanija", is located within the Romanija geographical region.

History
In 1991 the area was incorporated into the SAO Romanija, a Serb-established autonomous province, which later merged with other SAOs to form Republika Srpska in 1992.

Religion
In Ravna Romanija there it is the medieval monastery of Sokolica, dedicated to Saint George. Ravna Romanija belongs to the parish in Mokro (of the Serbian Orthodox Church), which is headquartered in the "Church of the Dormition of the Virgin" in Mokro.

Demographic history
According to the 1991 census, the village had 115 inhabitants, out of whom 111 were Serbs (96,52%), 3 Muslims (2,61%), and 1 Yugoslav (0,87%). In 2013 the population has increased to 260, nearly all Orthodox Serbs.

References

Populated places in Sokolac
Romanija plateau